Crabbea is a genus of flowering plants native to eastern and southern Africa. They are generally low-growing perennial herbs. The five-petaled flowers are surrounded by prickly bracts.

The small leaves of some species of Crabbea are used as part of a Xhosa food called imifino (boiled leaf vegetables), or as a condiment or relish to accompany grains. A Xhosa common name for these plants is krakrisa.

As of 2020, there are 13 accepted species in the genus:

Crabbea acaulis 
Crabbea albolutea 
Crabbea cirsioides 
Crabbea coerulea 
Crabbea glandulosa 
Crabbea kaessneri 
Crabbea longipes 
Crabbea migiurtina 
Crabbea nana 
Crabbea pinnatifida 
Crabbea thymifolia 
Crabbea velutina 
Crabbea zambiana

References

Acanthaceae genera
Flora of Africa
Leaf vegetables
Acanthaceae